Pitten is a Market Municipality in the district of Neunkirchen in the Austrian federal state of Lower Austria.

Geography 
Pitten lies in the northern part of the "Bucklige Welt".

Population

References

Cities and towns in Neunkirchen District, Austria
Bucklige Welt